Daniel Santamans (4 September 1959 in Lombez – 26 July 2008 in Cugnaux) was a French former rugby union player, as a hooker, and coach.

He played for Blagnac SCR and for Stade Toulousain, from 1977 to 1989, where he won 3 titles of French Champion (1985, 1986 and 1989) and a Cup of France, in 1984.

After ending his player career, he became a coach, first at the youths level of Stade Toulousain (1989–1995). He won 4 titles (1990, 1991, 1994 and 1995), before being promoted to assistant coach  at the main team (1995–1997). He won the French Championship in 1997.

He later coached the French teams of FC Lourdes (2000–2002), Tarbes Pyrénées Rugby (2002–2003) and Blagnac SCR (2003–2004).

Santamans was signed for Romania in 2004, where he remained until 2007. He won the Six Nations Tournament, Group B, in 2006, and qualified Romania for the 2007 Rugby World Cup finals. Romania achieved a bonus point at the 18-24 loss to Italy and a 14-10 win over Portugal.

After that, he returned to France, to become the coach of Blagnac SCR.

He died unexpectedly from a cardiovascular accident, at the funeral of his mother, aged only 48.

1959 births
2008 deaths
French rugby union players
French rugby union coaches
Rugby union hookers
Romania national rugby union team coaches